The 2001–02 Anycall Professional Basketball season was the sixth season of the Korean Basketball League which is held in the month of October and finishes by April of the next year.

Regular season

Playoffs

Prize money
Daegu Tongyang Orions: KRW 150,000,000 (champions + regular-season 1st place)
Seoul SK Knights: KRW 80,000,000 (runners-up + regular-season 2nd place)
Jeonju KCC Egis: KRW 20,000,000 (regular-season 3rd place)

External links
Official KBL website (Korean & English)

2001–02
2001–02 in South Korean basketball
2001–02 in Asian basketball leagues